The Bay Miwok are a cultural and linguistic group of Miwok, a Native American people in Northern California who live in Contra Costa County. They joined the Franciscan mission system during the early nineteenth century, suffered a devastating population decline, and lost their language as they intermarried with other native California ethnic groups and learned the Spanish language.

The Bay Miwok were not recognized by modern anthropologists or linguists until the mid-twentieth century. In fact, Alfred L. Kroeber, father of California anthropology, who knew of one of their constituent local groups, the Saklan (Saclan), from nineteenth-century manuscript sources, presumed that they spoke an Ohlone ( Costanoan) language.

In 1955 linguist Madison Beeler recognized an 1821 vocabulary taken from a Saclan man at Mission San Francisco as representative of a Miwok language. The language was named "Bay Miwok" and its territorial extent was rediscovered during the 1960s (see Landholding Groups or Local Tribes section below).

Culture
The Bay Miwok lived by hunting and gathering, and lived in small bands without centralized political authority. They spoke Bay Miwok also known as Saclan.  They were skilled at basketry.

Religion

The original Bay Miwok people's world view was a form of Shamanism. As they were centrally located along an arc of Miwok-speaking groups across Central California, the Bay Miwok  probably shared the Kuksu religion ceremonial motifs common to both the Coast Miwok to the west and Plains Miwok to the east. The Kuksu religion (dubbed the Kuksu Cult by early historians) included a cycle of elaborate dancing ceremonies, each with its own group of actors and distinctive feather-decorated regalia, an all-male society that met in subterranean dance rooms, puberty rites of passage, shamanic intervention with the spirit world, and, in some areas, an annual mourning ceremony. Varying forms of the Kuksu Cult were shared with other indigenous ethnic groups of Central California, such as their neighbors the northern Ohlone, Maidu, Patwin, Pomo, and Wappo. However Kroeber observed less "specialized cosmogony" in the Miwok, which he termed one of the "southern Kuksu-dancing groups", in comparison to the Maidu and other northern California tribes.

Traditional narratives and mythology
The specific myths, legends, tales, and histories of the Bay Miwok are not well documented.  C. Hart Merriam published a creation story, The Birth of Wek-Wek and the Creation of Man, centered on Mt. Diablo, that was told by a Hool-poom'-ne Miwok, perhaps a descendant of the Julpun Bay Miwok of Marsh Creek, eastern Contra Costa County.

One might suspect that the full corpus of Bay Miwok mythology and sacred narrative shared the motifs that the linguistically related and better-documented ethnographic Coast Miwok and Sierra Miwok held in common. All Miwok peoples believed in animal and human spirits, and saw the animal spirits as their ancestors. Coyote was seen as the representation of their creator god. The Sierra and Plains Miwok, as well as the Bay Miwok, believed this world began at Mount Diablo, following a flood.

Landholding groups or local tribes
The names and general territorial areas of seven Bay Miwok-speaking land-holding groups have been inferred through indirect methods, based for the most part on information in the ecclesiastical records of missions San Francisco and San Jose. In a 1961 Ph.D. dissertation, James Bennyhoff used data from the Alphonse Pinart transcripts of the mission records to identify four more East Bay local territorial groups, in addition to the Saclan, as members of this unique Miwok language group. "The major clues to the linguistic affiliation of these river mouth tribelets are provided by the personal names of female neophytes recorded in the baptismal registers ... Ompin, Chupcan, Julpun, and Wolwon [Volvon-ed.] are linked together by the use of a distinctive constellation of endings which appear in female personal names," he wrote. Milliken subsequently used the same technique, applied to the original mission records, to identify two additional local tribes—Jalquin and Tatcan—as Bay Miwok speakers. Milliken then inferred and mapped the relative locations of all seven groups, using clues from historic diaries together with mission register information regarding intermarriage patterns among East Bay local tribes. The locations of the seven Bay Miwok local tribes are generally as follows:

 At and surrounding present-day City of Concord: Chupcan.
 At Mt. Diablo, surrounding present-day City of Clayton and east along Marsh Creek to Brentwood: Volvon (also spelled Wolwon, and Bolbon).
 Along lower Marsh Creek (east of Antioch): Julpun.
 At present-day City of Pittsburg and north to rural south Solano County: Ompin .
 At and surrounding present-day cities of Lafayette and Walnut Creek: Saclan.
 At and surrounding present-day City of Danville, on San Ramon Creek: Tatcan.
 In south portion of present-day City of Oakland, in present City of San Leandro, and on San Leandro Creek to the east: Jalquin.

Another group, the Yrgin of present-day City of Hayward and Castro Valley, had Chochenyo Ohlone signature female name endings, rather than Bay Miwok name endings. Yet they were so highly intermarried with the Jalquin that it seems possible that they and the Jalquin formed a single bilingual local tribe.

History
Documentation of Miwok peoples dates back as early as 1579 by a priest on a ship under the command of Francis Drake. Identification and references to the Bay Miwok tribes exists from California Mission records as early as 1794.

Spanish-American Franciscans set up Catholic missions in the Bay Area in the 1770s, but did not reach the Bay Miwok territory until 1794. Beginning in 1794, the Bay Miwoks were forced to migrate to the Franciscan missions, most to Mission San Francisco de Asís (of San Francisco), but some others to Mission San José (in present-day Fremont). All but the Ompin and Julpun in the northeast were at the missions by the end of 1806; the latter two groups moved to Mission San José during the 1810-1812 period. The first baptisms and emigration to the missions of each tribe were:
In 1794-1795, 143 Saclans were baptized at the San Francisco Mission (25 more in later years).
In 1799-1805, 152 Yrgins were baptized at the San Jose Mission.
In 1801-1803, 77 Jalquins were baptized at the San Francisco Mission.
In 1804, 127 Tatcans were baptized at San Francisco Mission.
In 1805, 44 Volvons were baptized at the San Jose Mission; another 54 were baptized at Mission San Francisco over 1805-1806.
In 1810, 146 Chupcans were baptized at the San Francisco Mission.
In 1811, 103 Julpuns were baptized at the San Jose Mission; others fled to the east and north, and continued to come in for baptism until as late as 1827.
In 1811, 99 Ompins were baptized at the San Jose Mission; 15 more were baptized in 1812.

Missionary linguist Felipe Arroyo de la Cuesta obtained the only extant Bay Miwok vocabulary during a visit to Mission San Francisco in 1821.

Population change over time
Estimates for the precontact populations of most native groups in California have varied substantially. (See Population of Native California.) Alfred L. Kroeber put the 1770 population of the Plains and Sierra Miwok (but excluding the  Bay Miwok, about whom he was not aware) at 9,000. Sherburne Cook carried out a more specific analysis of contact-period population in Alameda and Contra Costa counties west of the San Joaquin Valley, without regard to the Ohlone-Bay Miwok language boundary; he suggested a total population of 2,248. Richard Levy estimated 19,500 people for all five Eastern Miwok groups as a whole (Bay, Plains, Northern Sierra, Central Sierra, and Southern Sierra) prior to Spanish contact, and 1,700 specifically for the Bay Miwok.

A total of 859 Bay Miwok speakers were baptized at the Franciscan missions (479 at Mission San Francisco and 380 at Mission San Jose), most between 1794 and 1812. By the end of 1823, only 52 of the Mission San Francisco Bay Miwoks were still alive, along with 11 of their Mission-born children. No comparable data are available for Mission San Jose that year, but by 1840 only 20 Bay Miwok people were alive there. Late nineteenth century survivors from both missions intermarried with people from other language groups. Descendants are alive today (see Present Day section below).

Present day
Some descendants of the Bay Miwok from the Mission San Francisco and Mission San Jose, are members of the Muwekma Ohlone Tribe of the San Francisco Bay Area. (Mission records have assisted in substantiating native genealogical persistence.) The Muwekma Ohlone Tribe states that: "all of the known surviving Native American lineages aboriginal to the San Francisco Bay region who trace their ancestry through the Missions Dolores, Santa Clara and San Jose" and who descend from members of the historic Federally Recognized Verona Band of Alameda County.

Notable Bay Miwok people
 1795 – Potroy, leader of a 1795 revolt and flight from Mission San Francisco by newly Christianized Saclans, he was arrested by Spanish soldiers in 1797, tried, and sentenced to three sets of whippings and one year in shackles at the San Francisco Presidio.
 1801 – Liberato Culpecse, born Jalquin, baptized at the Mission San Francisco in 1801, one of the main ancestors of the present day Muwekma Tribal community.

See also 
 Miwok

Notes

References

 Bennyhoff, James A. 1977. Ethnogeography of the Plains Miwok. Center for Anthropological Research at Davis, Publication 5. Department of Anthropology, University of California, Davis.
 Beeler, Madison S. 1955.  Saclan. International Journal of American Linguistics 21:201-209.
 Beeler, Madison S. 1959.  Saclan Once More. International Journal of American Linguistics 25:67-68.
 Cook, Sherburne F. 1957.  The Aboriginal Population of Alameda and Contra Costa Counties, California. University of California Anthropological Records 16:131-156. Berkeley
 Forester, Maria The Bay Miwok of Contra Costa County. Retrieved on 16 Sept 2006.
 Kroeber, Alfred L. 1907. The Religion of the Indians of California, University of California Publications in American Archaeology and Ethnology 4:#6. Berkeley, CA. sections titled "Shamanism", "Public Ceremonies", "Ceremonial Structures and Paraphernalia", and "Mythology and Beliefs"; available at Sacred Texts Online
 Kroeber, Alfred L. 1925. Handbook of the Indians of California. Washington, D.C: Bureau of American Ethnology Bulletin No. 78. (Chapter 30, The Miwok); available at Yosemite Online Library.
 Levy, Richard. 1978. Eastern Miwok. In California, Robert F. Heizer, ed., Volume 8 of Handbook of North American Indians, William C. Sturtevant, general editor. Washington, DC: Smithsonian Institution, 1978.  / 0160045754, pages 398-413.
 Merriam, C. Hart. 1910. The Dawn of the World: Myths and Weird Tales Told by the Mewan Indians of California. Cleveland: Arthur H. Clark.
 Milliken, Randall. 1995. A Time of Little Choice: The Disintegration of Tribal Culture in the San Francisco Bay Area 1769-1910. Menlo Park, CA: Ballena Press Publication.  (alk. paper)
 Milliken, Randall. 2008. Native Americans at Mission San Jose. Banning, CA: Malki-Ballena Press.  (alk. paper)
 Milliken, Randall, Laurence H. Shoup, and Beverly R. Ortiz. 2009. Ohlone/Costanoan Indians of the San Francisco Peninsula and Their Neighbors, Yesterday and Today. Technical report prepared by Archaeological and Historical Consultants, Oakland, California for the National Park Service, Golden Gate Recreation Area, Fort Mason, San Francisco, California.

Further reading
 Callaghan, Catherine A. 1971.  Saclan: A Re-examination. Anthropological Linguistics 13:448-456.
 Tullus, Margo Diane. 1978. Diablo's Children, The History of Contra Costa County. Self-published.

External links
Access Genealogy: Indian Tribal records, Miwok Indian Tribe
Native Tribes, Groups, Language Families and Dialects of California in 1770 (map after Kroeber)
Saclan language overview at the Survey of California and Other Indian Languages
Bay Miwok Language & Land Museum of the San Ramon Valley 

California Mission Indians
Native American tribes in California
Contra Costa County, California
Miwok